The 2018–19 winter transfer window for Italian football transfers opens on 3 January and will close on 31 January. Additionally, players without a club may join at any time. This list includes transfers featuring at least one Serie A or Serie B club which were completed after the end of the summer 2018 transfer window and before the end of the 2018–19 winter window.

Transfers
Legend
Those clubs in Italic indicate that the player already left the team on loan on this or the previous season or new signing that immediately left the club

December

January

February

References
General
 
 
 
Specific

Italy
2018-19
Winter transfers